Hebia flavipes is a European species of tachinid flies in the genus Hebia of the family Tachinidae.

References

Exoristinae
Diptera of Europe
Insects described in 1830